Bayldon is a surname. Notable people with the surname include:

Arthur Bayldon (1865–1958), English-born Australian poet
Geoffrey Bayldon (1924-2017), British actor
Francis Joseph Bayldon (1872–1948), Australian mariner and nautical instructor